Earlham Institute (EI, formerly The Genome Analysis Centre (TGAC)) is a life science research institute located at the Norwich Research Park (NRP), Norwich, England. EI's research is focused on exploring living systems by applying computational science and biotechnology to answer ambitious biological questions and generate enabling resources.

History 

The institute was established by the Biotechnology and Biological Sciences Research Council in partnership with East of England Development Agency (EEDA), Norfolk County Council, Norwich City Council, South Norfolk Council and the Greater Norwich Development Partnership. It cost £13.5 million, and was built by Morgan Sindall. It was officially opened on 3 July 2009 by John Sulston, winner of the 2002 Nobel Prize in Physiology or Medicine, and former Director of the Wellcome Trust Sanger Institute, another genomics research institution.

In early June 2011, it unveiled a supercomputer on its site that has the most powerful processor in the world that runs Red Hat Linux, with six terabytes of RAM. It was installed to crack the structure of the wheat genome, which is five times larger than the human genome.

In June 2016, Earlham Institute completed a rebranding project which saw the name transition from The Genome Analysis Centre (TGAC) to Earlham Institute (EI).

Structure 

It is situated on the Norwich Research Park, to the west of Norwich on the former A47 (B1108), and adjacent to the west of the University of East Anglia, next to the River Yare.

Function 

The goal of this institute is to be at the forefront of data intensive science in biology, to be a leader in bioinformatics innovation and the application of genome technology and to enable bioscience through dissemination of the data and technology produced in the institute and in collaboration with external scientists worldwide. Project specialisms include wheat and ryegrass, but the wider research carried out includes vertebrate, evolutionary, environment, and regulatory genomics as well as data infrastructure and software development to support the international bioscience community. EI makes its research open access where possible.

Directors
Earlham Institute has been directed by:
 Prof Jane Rogers from July 2009 to December 2012;
 Prof Mario Caccamo from January 2013 to July 2015;
 Prof Dylan Edwards from August 2015 (Interim Director)
 Prof Neil Hall from April 2016 (Current Director)

Communicating science 

One of the responsibilities of EI is to communicate the science it undertakes to a range of audiences, such as the international scientific community, the general public, school children, and students. It runs various programmes throughout the year to deliver this responsibility, as well as producing editorial features to explain the research it carries out.

Facilities

EI has a state-of-the-art scientific training facility which helps support the delivery of workshops and training courses to support the international bioscience community.

Sequencing platforms
EI is equipped with next-generation sequencing and genomics platforms for high-throughput data generation for research projects. EI historically has been an early adopter of new technologies for its scientific research, but also makes these available to the UK bioscience community through its National Capability in Genomics.

 Illuina NovaSeq
 Illumina HiSeq 2500
 Illumina MiSeq
 Illumina iSeq100
 PacBio Sequel
 PacBio Sequel II
 Oxford Nanopore MinION
 Oxford Nanopore GridION
 10X Chromium

Pandemic support 
Scientists at Earlham Institute and Quadram Institute are helping to develop a new tool to translate the dynamic microbiome/body communication. The method would be useful to researchers seeking to learn how microbes impact safety, the modifications contributing to illness, and pointing to new targets for medicines.

References

External links

Biotechnology in the United Kingdom
Biotechnology organizations
Bioinformatics organizations
Buildings and structures completed in 2009
Buildings and structures in Norwich
Genetics in the United Kingdom
Genetics or genomics research institutions
Government agencies established in 2009
Organisations based in Norwich
Research institutes in Norfolk
South Norfolk
2009 establishments in England
Research institutes established in 2009